Bulgaria does not recognize any type of same-sex unions. The issues of same-sex marriage, registered partnerships, and adoption by same-sex couples have been discussed frequently over the past few years, though no law on the matter has passed the National Assembly.

The Constitution of Bulgaria defines marriage as "a union between a man and a woman", effectively prohibiting the legalization of same-sex marriage. Only civil marriages are recognised by law in Bulgaria.

Registered partnerships
In 2008 and 2009, there were many debates on several national TV stations on the subject of registered partnerships, with the participation of politicians, religious leaders, gay activists and others. In April 2009, there was a debate about introducing same-sex registered partnerships in Bulgaria. The government had suggested that the National Assembly vote in favor of the new Family Code, which was supposed to include registered partnerships providing some of the rights and benefits of marriage. Initially, the partnerships would not have been open to same-sex couples. However, on July 16, 2008, the Commission for Protection against Discrimination in Bulgaria suggested that the right to registered partnerships be extended to same-sex couples as well. The Catholic Church subsequently announced its opposition to recognising registered partnerships, stating that legally recognising registered partnerships for both different-sex and same-sex couples would "weaken" and "jeopardise" the institution of marriage. Some opponents further stated that the Family Code would legalise incest and polygamy, despite the draft code explicitly prohibiting both. On June 12, 2009, the new Family Code was passed without provisions recognizing registered partnerships for either same-sex or opposite-sex couples.

The issue of whether the Family Code should recognise registered partnerships and provide cohabiting couples with several rights available to married couples, including the right to adopt and provide consent for medical treatment, resurfaced in 2012. Opponents claimed that legalising registered partnerships would "weaken" the institution of marriage and "confuse" children, while supporters claimed that it would protect families who choose not to marry as well as the children of such families. According to the National Statistical Institute, about 59% of all Bulgarian children born in 2012 were born to unmarried parents.

Same-sex marriage

Background
The Constitution of Bulgaria explicitly prohibits the recognition of same-sex marriage. Article 46 states: "Matrimony shall be a free union between a man and a woman. Only a civil marriage shall be legal." The only way to legalise same-sex marriage in Bulgaria is to amend the Constitution, which requires a two-thirds majority in the National Assenbly on three occasions.

In 2017, a same-sex couple from Lyulin, Sofia, Lily Babulkova and Darina Koilova, filed a lawsuit to have their marriage performed in the United Kingdom recognised in Bulgaria. The Sofia Administrative Court rejected their case in January 2018. However, a group of lawyers representing the couple appealed that decision. The Supreme Administrative Court of Bulgaria upheld the lower court's decision in December 2019. The couple issued the following statement after the court ruling, "The law's job is to regulate realities in a society. Our family is such a reality, and I regret that the Supreme Court in our country did not have the courage to admit this fact. Not recognizing our marriage does not have the power to break the bond between us. But it has the power to make our lives much more difficult. It is a pity when your own country creates difficulties and makes you feel small and insignificant, and I am sure that in this respect, many people know how we feel. Now, however, holidays are coming and we just want to wish everyone to enjoy them with their loved ones, with warmth and affection, as we will do."

2018 European Court of Justice ruling	

	
On June 5, 2018, the European Court of Justice (ECJ) ruled that European Union member states must recognise the freedom of movement and residency rights of same-sex spouses, provided one partner is an EU citizen. The court ruled that EU member states may choose whether or not to allow same-sex marriage, but they cannot obstruct the freedom of residence of an EU citizen and their spouse. In addition, the court ruled that the term "spouse" is gender-neutral, and that it does not necessarily imply a person of the opposite sex.

Citing the ruling, a Sofia court granted a same-sex couple the right to live in Bulgaria on 29 June 2018. The couple, an Australian woman and her French spouse, who had married in France in 2016, were denied residency in Bulgaria in 2017 when they attempted to renew their residency status, which had been previously granted under the EU mobility directive. In January 2019, Bulgarian immigration officials appealed the decision. On 25 July 2019, the Supreme Administrative Court upheld the lower court's ruling. The couple's lawyer, Denitsa Lyubenova, said the move could be an important first step toward the legalization of same-sex marriage in Bulgaria.

Public opinion
The 2015 Eurobarometer found that 17% of Bulgarians supported same-sex marriage. This was the lowest support in the European Union, and only a 2% change from the 2006 Eurobarometer, when 15% of Bulgarians expressed support for same-sex marriage.

The 2019 Eurobarometer found that 16% of Bulgarians thought same-sex marriage should be allowed throughout Europe, while 74% were against.

See also
LGBT rights in Bulgaria
Common-law marriage
Recognition of same-sex unions in Europe

References

LGBT rights in Bulgaria
Bulgaria